Pull Tiger Tail (often abbreviated to PTT) were an indie rock band based in London and originating from Stratford-upon-Avon and Edinburgh; they formed in 2006 while attending Goldsmiths College. All three members had grown up together in Stratford-upon-Avon where they played in indie-rock band Antihero, releasing two singles and winning the support of John Peel on Radio 1. The three friends shared a flat together when moving to London to attend Goldsmiths.

Pull Tiger Tail played their debut gig at London's Tatty Bogle club on 2 February 2006.

The band released their debut single, "Animator", on Young and Lost Club Records on 25 September 2006. Copies were limited to 1000, with 500 7"s, each hand customised by the band, and 500 CDs available.

Their final single with B-Unique was "Hurricanes", released on 11 June 2007. An iTunes error prevented the single hitting the Top 40. Because of this, the band was dropped. However, B-Unique retained the band's album, resulting in a lengthy legal battle to return the album to Pull Tiger Tail.

As of 2009, following the release of PAWS., the band have gone their separate ways, although a b-sides and rarities album, The Lost World, was released on 14 December 2009. In mid-2009, Hamson joined the indie folk group Noah and the Whale for a short time after drummer Doug Fink left the band. In 2011 he joined Friendly Fires on percussion and bass guitar for their Pala world tour.

In 2012, Ratcliff and Hamson re-emerged as a duo called Thumpers.

Band members
 Marcus Ratcliff - guitar, keys, vocals
 Davo McKenzie-McConville - bass, keys, vocals
 John Hamson - drums, vocals

Discography
Albums
Paws. (New Art, Please, 17 August 2009)
The Lost World (New Art, Please, 14 December 2009)

Singles
"Animator" (Young and Lost Club Records, 25 September 2006)
"Mr 100%" (B-Unique Records, 11 December 2006)
"Let's Lightning" (B-Unique Records, 26 March 2007)
"Hurricanes" (B-Unique Records, 18 June 2007)
"Mary Jane" (Young and Lost Club Records, 2 June 2008)

References

External links
Official Site
Myspace.com
Guardian: Pull Tiger Tail
Interview
CD Review
Live Show Review

English indie rock groups
Musical groups from London
Musical groups established in 2006
Alumni of Goldsmiths, University of London